Peter Bol Arok is the current bishop of the Anglican Church of South Sudan.

References

21st-century Anglican bishops in Africa
South Sudanese Anglican bishops
Year of birth missing (living people)
Living people
Bishops of the Anglican Church of South Sudan
Anglican bishops of Nakuru